Vergos is a surname. Notable people with the surname include:

Charlie Vergos (1925–2010), American restaurateur
Dimitrios Vergos (1886–1956), Greek champion in wrestling, weightlifting, and shot put
Nikos Vergos (born 1996), Greek footballer